Libbāli-šarrat (Akkadian: Libbāli-šarrat, meaning "the inner city [=Ishtar?] is queen") was a queen of the Neo-Assyrian Empire as the primary consort of Ashurbanipal (669–631 BC). Libbāli-šarrat married Ashurbanipal before he became king, probably in 672 BC, and may have lived beyond her husband's death, as documents from the reign of her probable son, Ashur-etil-ilani (631–627 BC) reference the "mother of the king". Libbāli-šarrat enjoys the distinction of being the only known individual from ancient Assyria who was not a king to be depicted holding court since she is depicted in one of Ashurbanipal's reliefs as hosting him at dinner in the palace garden, surrounded by her own female servants.

Life

Wife of the crown prince 

It is not clear when Libbāli-šarrat married Ashurbanipal. The queen of Ashurbanipal's father Esarhaddon (681–669 BC), Ešarra-ḫammat, died in February 672 BC. Contemporary documents recording Ešarra-ḫammat's funeral arrangements record the presence of the queen's daughter and daughter-in-law. Presumably, the daughter was the eldest daughter, Šērūʾa-ēṭirat, and the daughter-in-law might have been Libbāli-šarrat. In that case, Libbāli-šarrat's marriage to Ashurbanipal took place before Ešarra-ḫammat's death, but the daughter-in-law mentioned could also be the wife of another of Ashurbanipal's sons. The Assyriologist Simo Parpola believes that Libbāli-šarrat did not marry Ashurbanipal until around the time he became crown prince, in May 672 BC.

The name  is unique and not known to have been borne by any other individual. Because it also incorporates the element  ("queen") it might not be her birth name, but rather a name she assumed upon her marriage to Ashurbanipal or when he was designated as crown prince and heir by Esarhaddon. Translated literally,  means "the inner city is queen". "The inner city" might be a term for the goddess Ishtar. Alternatively, the name should perhaps be interpreted as "[in] the inner city, [the goddess] is queen".  was also the name of the ancient temple quarter at Assur, Assyria's religious center.

There may have existed some tension between Libbāli-šarrat and Ashurbanipal's sister Šērūʾa-ēṭirat. In  670 BC, near the end of Esarhaddon's reign, Šērūʾa-ēṭirat wrote a letter to Libbāli-šarrat in which she reprimanded the future queen for not studying and informed her that while Libbāli-šarrat would one day become queen, Šērūʾa-ēṭirat still outranked her as she was the king's daughter. An alternative reading of the letter is that it was a somewhat brusque attempt at trying to help Libbāli-šarrat adjust to royal life, not an attempt to put her in her place. Šērūʾa-ēṭirat's letter suggested that Libbāli-šarrat may not have been able to read and write at this time, and that shame would be brought on the royal family if she would be unable to do so after becoming queen. Although Libbāli-šarrat, as the wife of a member of the Assyrian royal family, would have long been groomed for her role, the letter illustrates that becoming the wife of the crown prince still required big adjustments at even a quite late stage. As can be inferred from later documents, Libbāli-šarrat did learn to read and write properly and in time began to share the scholarly and literary interests of her husband, who is famous for assembling the Library of Ashurbanipal.

Queen of Assyria 
Beginning under reforms initiated by Sargon II (722–705 BC), the queens of the Sargonid dynasty of Assyrian kings had their own military units sworn directly to them. Among the military staff of Libbāli-šarrat was the chariot driver Marduk-šarru-uṣur, who distinguished himself in the 652–648 civil war against Ashurbanipal's brother Shamash-shum-ukin.
Libbāli-šarrat is famously depicted along with Ashurbanipal in Ashurbanipal's "Garden Party" relief, wherein the two are depicted as dining, surrounded by Libbāli-šarrat's female servants, with Libbāli-šarrat herself sitting opposite her husband in a high-backed chair. Ashurbanipal meanwhile is depicted reclining on a couch. The royal couple are in the relief raising their cups up in celebration over Ashurbanipal's 653 BC victory over Elam, with the head of the Elamite king Teumman hanging from one of the trees. Libbāli-šarrat's high status as consort is illustrate in the relief by how close she is to the king as well as her jewelry and dress. Ashurbanipal is shown to have greater power still, as he is depicted slightly larger and higher up in the image. A striking detail with the "Garden Party" relief, however, is that while Ashurbanipal does not wear his crown, Libbāli-šarrat does. The fact that she is seated while Ashurbanipal is reclining is also significant, since sitting on a throne was a divine and royal privilege. This means that the entire scene is actually organized around Libbāli-šarrat, rather than Ashurbanipal. The relief is the only known surviving image from ancient Assyria depicting an individual other than the king not only effectively holding court but also hosting the king.

In addition to the "Garden Party" relief, another contemporary depiction of Libbāli-šarrat, on a stele, is known. This portrait shows the queen in a formal pose making some form of ritualistic gesture with a plant. Noblewomen in Assyria, including queens, regularly made donations to temples and dedications to the gods as a way to garner divine favor and support. One such dedication written by Libbāli-šarrat is known, which reads:

Libbāli-šarrat was presumably the mother of Ashurbanipal's immediate successors, Aššur-etil-ilāni (669–631 BC) and Sîn-šar-iškun (669–631 BC), given that sons born of Ashurbanipal's lower-ranking wives, such as a son by the name of Ninurta-sharru-usur, appear to not have played any political roles. Libbāli-šarrat might have lived for some time after Ashurbanipal's death in 631 BC, as there is a tablet dating to Ashur-etil-ilani's reign referencing the "mother of the king".

Notes

References

Bibliography 

 

 

Neo-Assyrian Empire
Sargonid dynasty
7th-century BC births
Ancient Assyrians
Ancient Mesopotamian women
Assyrian queens
Year of death unknown
7th-century BC people